Rinaldo Santana dos Santos (born August 24, 1975 in Rio Piracicaba-MG), or simply Rinaldo, is a Brazilian striker. He currently plays for Guarany Sporting Club.

Career
He played South Korean side FC Seoul in 2004.

Honours
Campeonato Cearense:2007

References

External links

Guardian Stats Centre
CBF  
globoesporte 

1975 births
Brazilian footballers
Brazilian expatriate footballers
Association football forwards
Living people
América Futebol Clube (MG) players
Clube Atlético Mineiro players
Club Athletico Paranaense players
Paraná Clube players
Associação Desportiva São Caetano players
Guarani FC players
FC Seoul players
K League 1 players
Sport Club do Recife players
Fortaleza Esporte Clube players
Expatriate footballers in South Korea
Goiás Esporte Clube players
América Futebol Clube (RN) players
Marília Atlético Clube players
Uberlândia Esporte Clube players
Brazilian expatriate sportspeople in South Korea